The 2002 FIBA World Championship for Women (Chinese: 2002年国际篮联世界女子锦标赛,2002 Nián guójì lán lián shìjiè nǚzǐ jǐnbiāosài) was hosted by China from September 14 to September 25, 2002.  It was co-organised by the International Basketball Federation (FIBA) and the Chinese federation.  The USA won the tournament, defeating Russia 79-74 for the gold medal.

Venues

Competing nations
Except China, which automatically qualified as the host, and the United States, which automatically qualified as the reigning Olympic champion, the 14 remaining countries qualified through their continents' qualifying tournaments:

Squads

Preliminary round

Group A

September 14, 2002

September 15, 2002

September 16, 2002

Group B

September 14, 2002

September 15, 2002

September 16, 2002

Group C

September 14, 2002

September 15, 2002

September 16, 2002

Group D

September 14, 2002

September 15, 2002

September 16, 2002

Eighth-final round

Group E

September 18, 2002

September 19, 2002

September 20, 2002

Group F

September 18, 2002

September 19, 2002

September 20, 2002

Knockout stage

Championship bracket

5th through 8th place

9th through 12th place

13th through 16th place

Awards

All-Tournament Team
 Shannon Johnson
 Amaya Valdemoro
 Elena Baranova
 Lauren Jackson
 Lisa Leslie

Final standings

References

External links
FIBA Archive

2002 in women's basketball
2002 in Chinese women's sport
2002
International women's basketball competitions hosted by China
September 2002 sports events in Asia
2002–03 in Chinese basketball